Ballygunner, is a civil parish in County Waterford, Ireland. It lies on the southern outskirts of Waterford city.

The placename is derived, in part, from the Old Norse masculine personal name Gunnarr.

Ballygunner contains several townlands: Ballygunner Mhór, Knockboy, Ballinakill, Grantstown, Williamstown and Ballinamuncha.

Main facilities in the parish are the local hurling club Ballygunner GAA, the adjacent St. Mary's National School and the 19th/29th Waterford St Mary's Ballygunner Scout Group.

See also
 Ballygunner Castle

References

Townlands of County Waterford